Caradog ap Gruffydd (died 1081) was a Prince of Gwent in south-east Wales in the time of Gruffydd ap Llywelyn and the Norman conquest, who reunified his family's inheritance of Morgannwg and made repeated attempts to reunite southern Wales by claiming the inheritance of the Kingdom of Deheubarth.

Background & Lineage 

The family's stronghold was the Kingdom of Glywysing and the Kingdom of Gwent, and Caradog was the grandson of the King of Glywysing, Rhydderch ab Iestyn who had been able to take over the throne of Deheubarth from 1023 until his death in 1033. Caradog's father Gruffydd ap Rhydderch, after receiving the Lordshop of Caerleon in 1031, also inherited Glywysing, and became King of Deheubarth in 1045, in the same year as Gruffydd's second cousin, Cadwgan ap Meurig, inherited the Kingdom of Gwent from his father Meurig ap Hywel. Both of them were co-descendants of Owain, son of Morgan Hen "the Old", the last ruler of a unified Kingdom of Morgannwg.

Gruffydd ap Rhydderch was said to be a powerful king who stoutly resisted raids by the Danes and attacks by Gruffydd ap Llywelyn. However in 1055 Gruffydd ap Llywelyn killed him in battle and took Deheubarth, campaigning through upper Gwent with an army of Welsh, Saxons and Danes to defeat Ralph, Earl of Hereford.

Early career 

After Gruffydd ap Llywelyn's victory in battle near Glasbury in 1056, by 1057 Gruffydd was recognized as King of Wales and Caradog received Caerleon. From the family's stronghold in Gwent, Caradog appears to have been able to add his Morgannwg inheritance during his early career. After the defeat of Gruffyd ap Llylewyn by Harold Godwinson in 1063, old lineages in the south were restored, with Caradog becoming ruler of Glywysing at about the same time as Maredudd ab Owain ab Edwin, the male-line heir of Hywel Dda, became ruler of Deheubarth.

Contest over Gwent 

Harold Godwinson subsequently began to build a hunting lodge in Portskewet. In 1065 Caradog attacked and destroyed Harold's hunting lodge, going on to ravage the district with his forces. Then, after Harold's defeat at the Battle of Hastings, the Normans sacked south-east Wales and parts of Gwent in response to Eadric's Herefordshire rebellion in alliance with the Welsh prince of Gwynedd (and Powys), Bleddyn ap Cynfyn. King Maredudd of Deheubarth decided not to resist the Norman encroachment on Gwent and was rewarded with lands in England in 1070, at the same time as the chronicler Orderic Vitalis noted in his Historia Ecclesiastica that a Welsh king named "Caducan" (Cadwgan ap Meurig) suffered defeat in battle at the hands of William FitzOsbern, 1st Earl of Hereford.

Contest for Deheubarth 

Caradog thereafter set out to emulate his father and grandfather by adding Deheubarth to his realm. In 1072 he defeated and killed King Maredudd of Deheubarth in a battle by the Rhymney River. In 1074 Caradog took over control over what was left of the war-ravaged Kingdom of Gwent from Cadwgan ap Meurig.

In 1078 Caradog won another victory over Rhys ab Owain, who had succeeded Maredudd as prince of Deheubarth, killing him too. By 1081 he had forced the new prince of Deheubarth, Rhys ap Tewdwr to flee to St David's Cathedral.

However the situation was changed by the arrival from Ireland of Gruffudd ap Cynan, who was aiming to seize the throne of Gwynedd from Trahaearn ap Caradog. Rhys ap Tewdwr and Gruffudd ap Cynan met at St David's Cathedral and made an alliance with the blessing of the Bishop of St Davids.

Killed at the Battle of Mynydd Carn 

Caradog countered this by himself making an alliance with the King of Gwynedd, Trahaearn ap Caradog. The two factions met in battle at Mynydd Carn, about a day's march north of St David's. Caradog and his ally Trahaearn were both killed.

Succession 

Caradog left a son, Owain ap Caradog, who contented himself with the rule of Gwynllwg and was the founder of the line of the Lords of Caerleon, while Iestyn ap Gwrgant became King of Morgannwg.

References

John Edward Lloyd (1911) A history of Wales from the earliest times to the Edwardian conquest (Longmans, Green & Co.)

People from Caerleon
1081 deaths
Monarchs of Deheubarth
Monarchs of Gwent
Monarchs of Morgannwg
Medieval Welsh killed in battle
11th-century Welsh monarchs
Year of birth unknown
Welsh princes
Monarchs killed in action
Monarchs of Glywysing